Pappanamcode Lakshmanan was an Indian film scriptwriter, screen play writer and lyricist in Malayalam movies during the 1970s and 1980s. He started his career with Indulekha in 1967. He worked for around 100 Malayalam movies with the areas of his contribution including lyrics, script, story and dialogue.

Filmography

Dialogue
 Udyaanalakshmi (1976)
 Pick Pocket (1976)
 Kayamkulam Kochunniyude Makan (1976)
 Ammaayi Amma (1977)
 Muttathe Mulla (1977)
 Randu Lokam (1977)
 Minimol (1977)
 Rathimanmadhan (1977)
 Ninakku Njaanum Enikku Neeyum (1978)
 Aanakkalari (1978)
 Mattoru Karnan (1978)
 Kanalkattakal (1978)
 Sundarimaarude Swapnangal (1978)
 Velluvili (1978)
 Praarthana (1978)
 Mudramothiram (1978)
 Bhaaryayum Kaamukiyumm (1978)
 Saayoojyam (1979)
 Ankakkuri (1979)
 Indradhanussu (1979)
 Vellayani Paramu (1979)
 Moorkhan (1980)
 Chandrahaasam (1980)
 Manushyamrugam (1980)
 Theenaalangal (1980)
 Kari Puranda Jeevithangal (1980)
 Nizhalyudham (1981)
 Ithihasam (1981)
 Sharam (1982)
 Dheera (1982)
 Bheeman (1982)
 Kaaliya Mardhanam (1982)
 Pooviriyum Pulari (1982)
 Aarambham (1982)
 Aadarsham (1982)
 Nagamadathu Thampuratti (1982)
 Ankam (1983)
 Kodumkattu (1983)
 Justice Raja (1983)
 Thaavalam (1983)
 Passport (1983)
 Kolakomban (1983)
 Ivide Ingane (1984)
 Kurishuyudham (1984)
 NH 47 (1984)
 Oru Sumangaliyude Katha (1984)
 Onnamprathi Olivil (1986)
 Bhavan (1986)
 Veendum Lisa (1986)

Screenplay
 Udyaanalakshmi (1976)
 Pick Pocket (1976)
 Kaayamkulam Kochunniyude Makan (1976)
 Ammaayi Amma (1977)
 Minimol (1977)
 Rathimanmadhan (1977)
 Ninakku Njaanum Enikku Neeyum (1978)
 Aanakkalari (1978)
 Mattoru Karnan (1978)
 Kanalkattakal (1978)

Story
 Udyaanalakshmi (1976)
 Pick Pocket (1976)
 Kaayamkulam Kochunniyude Makan (1976)
 Ammaayi Amma (1977)
 Minimol (1977)
 Rathimanmadhan (1977)
 Ninakku Njaanum Enikku Neeyum (1978)
 Aanakkalari (1978)
 Mattoru Karnan (1978)
 Kanalkattakal (1978)

Cast
Indulekha (1967)

References

External links

Pappanamkodu Lakshmanan at MSI

Malayalam film directors
Malayalam screenwriters
Malayalam-language lyricists
1936 births
1998 deaths
20th-century Indian dramatists and playwrights
20th-century Indian film directors
Film directors from Kerala
Screenwriters from Kerala
20th-century Indian screenwriters